Hampstead Heath (locally known simply as the Heath) is an ancient heath in London, spanning . This grassy public space sits astride a sandy ridge, one of the highest points in London, running from Hampstead to Highgate, which rests on a band of London Clay. The heath is rambling and hilly, embracing ponds, recent and ancient woodlands, a lido, playgrounds, and a training track, and it adjoins the former stately home of Kenwood House and its estate. The south-east part of the heath is Parliament Hill, from which the view over London is protected by law.

Running along its eastern perimeter is a chain of ponds – including three open-air public swimming pools – which were originally reservoirs for drinking water from the River Fleet. The heath is a Site of Metropolitan Importance for Nature Conservation, and part of Kenwood is a Site of Special Scientific Interest. Lakeside concerts are held there in summer. The heath is managed by the City of London Corporation, and lies mostly within the London Borough of Camden with the adjoining Hampstead Heath Extension and Golders Hill Park in the London Borough of Barnet.

History

The heath first entered the history books in 986 when Ethelred the Unready granted one of his servants five hides of land at "Hemstede". This same land is later recorded in the Domesday Book of 1086 as held by the monastery of St. Peter's at Westminster Abbey, and by then is known as the "Manor of Hampstead". Westminster held the land until 1133 when control of part of the manor was released to one Richard de Balta; then during Henry II's reign the whole of the manor became privately owned by Alexander de Barentyn, the King's butler. Octavia Hill and the Commons Preservation Society campaigned for the Heath to be protected under law culminating in the 1871 Hampstead Heath Act which states that it would be "of great advantage to the inhabitants of the Metropolis if the Heath were always kept unenclosed and unbuilt on, its natural aspect and state being as far as may be preserved." Hill and the Society also raised funds to purchase land for the Heath from private owners. Manorial rights to the land remained in private hands until the 1940s when they lapsed under Sir Spencer Pocklington Maryon Wilson, though the estate itself was passed on to Shane Gough, 5th Viscount Gough.

Over time, plots of land in the manor were sold off for building, particularly in the early 19th century, though the heath remained mainly common land. The main part of the heath was acquired for the people by the Metropolitan Board of Works. Parliament Hill was purchased for the public for £300,000 and added to the park in 1888. Golders Hill was added in 1898 and Kenwood House and grounds were added in 1928.

From 1808 to 1814 Hampstead Heath hosted a station in the shutter telegraph chain which connected the Admiralty in London to its naval ships in the port of Great Yarmouth.

The City of London Corporation has managed the heath since 1989. Before that it was managed by the GLC and before that by the London County Council (LCC).

In 2021, Quiet Parks International—a non-profit organisation whose aim is to identify locations around the world that remain free from human-made noise for at least brief periods—gave Hampstead Heath "Urban Quiet Park" status.

Geography
The heath sits astride a sandy ridge that rests on a band of London clay. It runs from east to west, its highest point being . As the sand was easily penetrated by rainwater which was then held by the clay, a landscape of swampy hollows, springs and man-made excavations was created.

Public transport near the heath includes London Overground railway stations Hampstead Heath and Gospel Oak and London Underground stations at Hampstead and Belsize Park to the south, Golders Green to the north-west, and Highgate and Archway to the east. Buses serve several roads around the heath.

Areas of the heath
The heath's  include a number of distinct areas.

Whitestone, Highgate and Hampstead Ponds

Hampstead Heath has over 25 ponds; most of these are in two distinct areas: the Highgate Ponds and the Hampstead Ponds.

Whitestone Pond
Whitestone Pond is a roughly triangular pond, centrally located on the heath's south side and north-northwest of Queen Mary's House (formerly a care home and before that a maternity hospital), across busy Heath Street (A502). Originally a small dew pond called the Horse Pond, it was renamed after a waypoint stone and is artificially fed.  It has an exposed location, closely surrounded by roads, which limits its recreational use. It is the heath's best known body of water, and many people's introduction to Hampstead Heath's ponds.

Highgate Ponds

Highgate Ponds are a series of eight former reservoirs, on the heath's east (Highgate) side, and were originally dug in the 17th and 18th centuries. They include two single-sex swimming pools (the men's and ladies' bathing ponds), a model boating pond, and two ponds which serve as wildlife reserves: the Stock Pond and the Bird Sanctuary Pond. Fishing is allowed in some of the ponds, although this is threatened by proposals to modify the dams.

The ponds are the result of the 1777 damming of Hampstead Brook (one of the Fleet River's sources), by the Hampstead Water Company, which was formed in 1692 to meet London's growing water demands.

"Boudicca's Mound", near the present men's bathing pond, is a tumulus where, according to local legend, Queen Boudicca (Boadicea) was buried after she and 10,000 Iceni warriors were defeated at Battle Bridge. However, historical drawings and paintings of the area show no mound other than a 17th-century windmill.

Hampstead Ponds

The Hampstead Ponds are three ponds in the heath's south-west corner, towards South End Green. Hampstead Pond #3 is the mixed bathing pond, where both sexes may swim.

Pond maintenance
In 2004 the City of London Corporation, rejected a proposal by the Hampstead Heath Winter Swimming Club to allow "early-morning, self-regulated swimming in the mixed sex pond on Hampstead Heath"; the Corporation argued that it risked legal action by the Health and Safety Executive if it allowed such swimming, since the Executive had refused to give assurances to the Corporation that it would not be prosecuted under the Health and Safety at Work Act. The swimmers successfully challenged this in the High Court, which in 2005 ruled that members of the swimming club had the right to swim at their own risk, and that the  would not be liable under the Act for injuries as a result.

In January 2011 the City of London announced a scheme which it said would improve the safety of the dams, to guard against damage that might result from a very large, but rare storm hitting London. The proposed engineering modifications of the dams were aimed at ensuring that three dams complied with the 1975 Reservoir Act. With the passage of the 2010 Flood and Water Management Act the City of London was advised that all the dams on the heath would need to comply with the reservoir safety regulations. The proposed works in 2011 included recommendations to improve the water quality of the lake, which had suffered from algae blooms. The proposals for the pond dams were extensively modified in 2012–2014. The proposals were challenged by a consortium of groups and societies collectively called "Dam Nonsense". However, with the dam project being now completed, many locals have begun to accept the changes as wildlife begins to soften the border between the artificial and the natural in this area.

Caen Wood Towers
To the north east of the heath is a derelict site within the conservation area comprising the grounds and mansion of the former Caen Wood Towers (renamed Athlone House in 1972). This historic building, currently in disrepair, was built in 1872 for Edward Brooke, aniline dye manufacturer (architect, Edward Salomons). In 1942 the building was taken for war service by the Royal Air Force and was used to house the RAF Intelligence School, although the 'official' line was that it was a convalescence hospital. The Operational Record (Form 540) of RAF Station Highgate (currently in the National Archives, Kew) was declassified in the late 1990s and shows the true role of this building in wartime service. The building sustained 2 near misses from V-1 flying bombs in late 1944, causing damage and injuries to staff. The RAF Intelligence School remained in Caen Wood Towers until 1948, when the building was handed over to the Ministry of Health. It was then used as a hospital and finally a post-operative recovery lodge, before falling into disrepair in the 1980s. The NHS sold off this part of their estate in 2004 to a private businessman who is currently redeveloping much of the site; however the House and its gardens fall within the conservation area of Hampstead Heath.

Parliament Hill Fields

Parliament Hill Fields lies on the south and east of the heath; it officially became part of the heath in 1888. It contains various sporting facilities including an athletics track, tennis courts and Parliament Hill Lido. Parliament Hill itself is considered by some to be the focal point of the heath, with the highest part of it known to some as "Kite Hill" due to its popularity with kite flyers. The skyscrapers of Canary Wharf and the City of London can be seen, along with St Paul's Cathedral and other landmarks, all in one panorama, parts of which are protected views.
The main staff yards for the management of the heath are located at Parliament Hill Fields.

In the south-east of the heath, on the southern slopes of Parliament Hill, is the Gospel Oak Lido open air swimming pool, with a running track and fitness area to its north.

Parliament Hill Fields was successfully defended from development in the late 19th Century by Octavia Hill and the Commons Preservation Society.

Kenwood

This became part of the heath when it was bequeathed to the nation by Lord Iveagh on his death in 1927, and opened to the public in 1928. The original house dates from the early 17th century. The orangery was added in about 1700.

Hampstead Heath Woods

One third of the Kenwood estate (Ken Wood and North Wood) is a biological Site of Special Scientific Interest, designated by Natural England.

The Vale of Health
The Vale of Health is a hamlet accessed by a lane from East Heath Road; it is surrounded entirely by the heath. In 1714, one Samuel Hatch, a harness maker, built a workshop and was granted some land. By 1720, he had a cottage at what was subsequently called Hatch's or Hatchett's Bottom.  A new name, considered given in deliberate attempt to change the image of a developing location, the Vale of Health, was recorded in 1801.

Extension
The Extension is an open space to the north-west of the main heath. It does not share the history of common and heathland of the rest of the heath. Instead it was created out of farmland, largely due to the efforts of Henrietta Barnett who went on to found Hampstead Garden Suburb. Its farmland origins can still be seen in the form of old field boundaries, hedgerows and trees.

Golders Hill Park

Golders Hill Park is a formal park adjoining the West Heath. It occupies the site of a large house that was bombed during World War II. It has an expanse of grass, with a formal flower garden, a duck pond and a separate water garden that leads to a separate area for deer, near a recently renovated small zoo. The zoo has donkeys, maras, ring-tailed lemurs, ring-tailed coatis, white-cheeked turacos and European eagle-owls, among other animals. There are also tennis courts, a butterfly house and a putting green.

Unlike the rest of the heath, Golders Hill Park is fenced in, and is closed at night.

Site of Special Scientific Interest

Ken Wood and North Wood are a biological Site of Special Scientific Interest called Hampstead Heath Woods, designated by Natural England.

Constabulary

The heath is policed by the Hampstead Heath Constabulary, part of the City of London Corporation. Its 12 constable act as parks police and they are:  From their inauguration until 24 May 2018 some constables worked with general purpose police dogs, all licensed to NPCC/Home Office standards. They have been responsible for patrolling the Heath since 1992.

Activities
The heath is home to a range of activities, including 16 different sports. It is used by walkers, runners, swimmers and kite-flyers.  Running events include the weekly parkrun and the annual Race for Life in aid of Cancer Research UK. Until February 2007 Kenwood held a series of popular lakeside concerts.

The West Heath is regarded as one of the safest night-time gay cruising grounds in London. George Michael revealed that he cruised on the heath, an activity he then parodied on the Extras Christmas Special.

Swimming takes place all year round in two of the three natural swimming ponds: the men's pond which opened in the 1890s, and the ladies' pond which opened in 1925. The mixed pond is only open from May to September, though it is the oldest, having been in use since the 1860s.

Facilities include an athletics track, a pétanque pitch, a volleyball court and eight separate children's play areas, including an adventure playground.

In popular culture
While living in London, Karl Marx and his family went to the heath regularly, as their favourite outing.

John Atkinson Grimshaw, Victorian-era painter, painted an elaborate night-time scene of Hampstead Hill in oils. Hampstead Heath also provided the backdrop for the opening scene in Victorian writer Wilkie Collins' novel The Woman in White.

Bram Stoker's novel Dracula is partly set on Hampstead Heath, in scenes when the undead Lucy abducts children playing on the heath.

Hampstead Heath forms part of the location for G. K. Chesterton's fictional story "The Blue Cross" from The Innocence of Father Brown.
The Heath is mentioned in Ralph Vaughan Williams' Symphony no. 2 'A London Symphony' with the subtitle 'Hampstead Heath on an August Bank Holiday'.

The photos used for the cover of The Kinks LP The Kinks Are The Village Green Preservation Society were taken on the heath in August 1968. In some photographs, Kenwood House is visible in the background.

Notting Hill (1999) featured scenes shot at the heath, located primarily around Kenwood House, where Julia Roberts' character was filming a movie.

In 2005, Giancarlo Neri's sculpture The Writer, a 9-metre-tall table and chair, was exhibited on Hampstead Heath.

The film Scenes of a Sexual Nature (2006) was shot entirely on Hampstead Heath.

Colin Wilson slept rough (in a sleeping bag) on Hampstead Heath to save money when he was working on his first novel, Ritual in the Dark.

In John le Carré's novel Smiley's People, the heath is the murder scene of General Vladimir, a pivotal event that leads to the downfall of George Smiley's nemesis Karla.

Gallery
Panorama of London from Kenwood (after completion of the Gherkin in 2003 but before the building of the Heron Tower in 2009–10).

See also

List of Sites of Special Scientific Interest in Greater London
Camden parks and open spaces
Barnet parks and open spaces
Nature reserves in Barnet

References

Bibliography

External links

 The official Hampstead Heath pages on the City of London website
 Hampstead Heath map
 Comprehensive and detailed website for Hampstead Heath
 History of Hampstead Heath

Parks and open spaces in the London Borough of Camden
Nature reserves in the London Borough of Camden
Parks and open spaces in the London Borough of Barnet
Nature reserves in the London Borough of Barnet
Parks and open spaces of the City of London Corporation
Hills of London
Sites of Special Scientific Interest in London
Highest points of English counties
Hampstead
Common land in London
Highgate
Heaths of the United Kingdom

da:Parliament Hill (London)